Sunninghill may refer to:

Sunninghill, Berkshire, England
Sunninghill, Gauteng, suburb of Johannesburg, South Africa

See also
Sunninghill Park, country house and estate in Berkshire, England
Sunninghill and Ascot, a civil parish in the Royal Borough of Windsor and Maidenhead, England
Sun Hill (disambiguation)